David McGill (1947-2022) was a Scottish international lawn and indoor bowler and commentator.

Bowls career

World Championship
McGill won a silver medal in the triples with John Summers and Willie McQueen  and two bronze medals in the singles and team event (Leonard Trophy) at the 1980 World Outdoor Bowls Championship in Melbourne.

Commonwealth Games
In 1978 MGill represented Scotland in the singles at the Commonwealth Games.

National
McGill was the 1976 national champion and subsequently won the singles at the British Isles Bowls Championships in 1977.

Commentating
He was an architect by trade and has also commentated for the BBC in televised bowls competitions.

References

Scottish male bowls players
1947 births
2022 deaths
Bowls players at the 1978 Commonwealth Games
Commonwealth Games competitors for Scotland